Sleaford was a county constituency in Lincolnshire, centred on the town of Sleaford.  It returned one Member of Parliament (MP)  to the House of Commons of the Parliament of the United Kingdom.

The constituency was created for the 1885 general election, when the former Mid Lincolnshire constituency was divided under the Redistribution of Seats Act 1885. It was abolished for the 1918 general election.

Members of Parliament

Election results

Elections in the 1880s 

Chaplin was appointed President of the Board of Agriculture, requiring a by-election.

Elections in the 1890s 

Chaplin was appointed President of the Local Government Board, requiring a by-election.

Elections in the 1900s

Elections in the 1910s 

General Election 1914–15:

Another General Election was required to take place before the end of 1915. The political parties had been making preparations for an election to take place and by the July 1914, the following candidates had been selected; 
Unionist: Edmund Royds
Liberal: Robert Pattinson

References

Parliamentary constituencies in Lincolnshire (historic)
Constituencies of the Parliament of the United Kingdom established in 1885
Constituencies of the Parliament of the United Kingdom disestablished in 1918
Sleaford